Alex Price (born 8 May 1985) is a British actor who has appeared in various television programmes including Being Human, Merlin and Doctor Who. He starred in feature-length films, such as A Horse with No Name, and in a variety of short films.

Since 2013, he has played Sid Carter, one of the main characters in the television series Father Brown. Price was praised by critics for his performance of Proteus in the television series Penny Dreadful. He has appeared in a vast number of stage productions like Is Everyone OK? (Nabokov Touring Project), Colourings (Old Red Lion), The Duchess of Malfi (National Theatre Studio), and Birdland (Royal Court Theatre). In 2016, he was cast as Draco Malfoy in the Harry Potter play, Harry Potter and the Cursed Child. Most recently he appeared in Capture. A BBC drama about deep fake technology.

Personal life
Alex Price has a younger sister and is married and has a son (2011).

Television

Film

Theatre

References

1985 births
English male television actors
Male actors from Manchester
Living people